Albert Colbec (10 March 1884 – 16 July 1966) was a French racing cyclist. He rode in the 1923 Tour de France.

References

1884 births
1966 deaths
French male cyclists
Place of birth missing